Toafa Takaniko (born ) is a French male volleyball player. He is part of the France men's national volleyball team. On club level he plays for Arago de Sète.

References

External links
 profile at FIVB.org

1985 births
Living people
French men's volleyball players
Wallis and Futuna men's volleyball players
Mediterranean Games bronze medalists for France
Competitors at the 2013 Mediterranean Games
Volleyball players at the 2015 European Games
European Games competitors for France
Mediterranean Games medalists in volleyball